Andrey Mikalayevich Khlebasolaw (born 22 November 1965) is a Belarusian professional football coach and a former player. 
His son Dmitri Khlebosolov is also a professional footballer.

Career 
Khlebasolaw started his football career at age 23 after three years in the navy.

Honours
Belshina Bobruisk
Belarusian Cup winner: 1996–97, 1998–99

Individual
 Belarusian Premier League top scorer: 1996, 1997.

References

External links
 
 
 

1965 births
Living people
Soviet footballers
Belarusian footballers
Association football forwards
Belarusian expatriate footballers
Belarus international footballers
Russian Premier League players
FC Dynamo Brest players
Wisła Kraków players
PFC Krylia Sovetov Samara players
Expatriate footballers in Poland
Belarusian expatriate sportspeople in Poland
Expatriate footballers in Russia
FC Baranovichi players
FC Fandok Bobruisk players
FC Belshina Bobruisk players
Belarusian football managers
FC Belshina Bobruisk managers
FC Baranovichi managers
FC Spartak-UGP Anapa players
People from Baranavichy
Sportspeople from Brest Region